Nägeli is a surname. Notable people with this surname include:

 Hans Franz Nägeli, also known as Hans Franz Nageli (1497-1579), Swiss politician and military leader
 Hans Georg Nägeli (1773-1836), Swiss composer and music publisher
 Carl Nägeli, also known as Carl Wilhelm von Nägel (1817-1891), Swiss botanist
 Otto Nägeli, also known as Otto Naegeli (1871-1938), Swiss hematologist
 Harald Nägeli, also known as Harald Naegeli (born 1938), Swiss artist